A buffer state is a country geographically lying between two rival or potentially hostile great powers. Its existence can sometimes be thought to prevent conflict between them. A buffer state is sometimes a mutually agreed upon area lying between two greater powers, which is demilitarized in the sense of not hosting the military of either power (though it will usually have its own military forces). The invasion of a buffer state by one of the powers surrounding it will often result in war between the powers.

Research shows that buffer states are significantly more likely to be conquered and occupied than are nonbuffer states. This is because "states that great powers have an interest in preserving—buffer states—are in fact in a high-risk group for death. Regional or great powers surrounding buffer states face a strategic imperative to take over buffer states: if these powers fail to act against the buffer, they fear that their opponent will take it over instead. By contrast, these concerns do not apply to nonbuffer states, where powers face no competition for influence or control."

Buffer states, when authentically independent, typically pursue a neutralist foreign policy, which distinguishes them from satellite states. The concept of buffer states is part of a theory of the balance of power that entered European strategic and diplomatic thinking in the 18th century.

Examples

Americas 
 Bolivia, created by Gran Colombia as a buffer between Peru and Argentina during the Upper Peru question.
 Uruguay, served as a demilitarized buffer between Argentina and the Empire of Brazil during the early independence period in South America.
 Paraguay, maintained after the end of the Paraguayan War in 1870, as a buffer separating Argentina and Brazil.
 Georgia, a colony established by Great Britain in 1732 as a buffer between its other colonies along the Atlantic coast of North America and Spanish Florida.
 Ecuador, served as a "cushion state" between Colombia and Peru, which had a bigger extension and military force and fought a war in the 1820s in what is now Ecuador.

Asia 
 Multiple buffer states played major roles during the Roman–Persian Wars (66 BC – 628 AD).  Armenia was a frequently contested buffer between the Roman Empire (as well as the later Byzantine Empire) and the various Persian and Muslim states.
 North Korea, during and after the Cold War, has been seen by some analysts as a buffer state between the military forces of China, the Soviet Union and those of South Korea, Japan, and the United States (stationed in South Korea, Japan and Taiwan from 1954 to 1979).
 Manchuria was a pro-Japanese buffer state between the Empire of Japan, the Soviet Union, and the Republic of China during World War II.
 The kingdom of Thailand, historically known as Siam, was an independent buffer state between the British Raj, British Malaya, French Indochina, and their competing colonial interests in Laos and Cambodia.
 Korea acted as a buffer zone between the growing superpowers of Imperial Japan and the Russian Empire.
 The Far Eastern Republic was a formally independent state created to act as a buffer between Bolshevik Russia and the Empire of Japan.
 Afghanistan was a buffer state between the British Empire, which ruled much of South Asia, and the Russian Empire, which ruled much of Central Asia, during the Anglo–Russian conflicts of the 19th century. Later, the Wakhan Corridor extended the buffer eastwards to the Chinese border.
 The Himalayan nations of  Tibet,   Nepal,  Bhutan, and  Sikkim were buffer states between the British Empire and China. Later, in the Sino-Indian War of 1962, they became buffers between China and India as the two powers fought along their borders.
 Mongolia acted as a buffer between the Soviet Union and China until 1991. It currently serves as a buffer between Russia and China
 is a buffer state between Israel and Syria.

Africa
 Morocco served as a buffer state between the Ottoman Empire, Spain, and Portugal in the 16th century.
Bechuanaland Protectorate (present-day  Botswana) was initially created by the British Empire as a buffer between the British Empire and the two Boer republics of Orange Free State and Transvaal Republic until the Second Boer War.

Europe 
 Switzerland has been a buffer state between Italy, Austria, France, Germany, and other state powers in medieval and modern Europe.
 The United Kingdom of the Netherlands, composed of today's Belgium and Netherlands, was  created by the Congress of Vienna in 1815 to maintain peace between France, Prussia, and the United Kingdom. The kingdom existed for 15 years until the Belgian revolution
  Belgium acted as buffer state between France, German Empire, Netherlands, and British Empire before the First World War
 The Rhineland served as a demilitarized zone between France and Germany during the inter-war years of the 1920s and early 1930s. There were early French attempts at creating a Rhineland Republic.
 The Socialist Soviet Republic of Byelorussia was founded as a buffer state between Soviet Russia and European powers.
 The Qasim Khanate (1452-1681) may have served as a buffer between Muscovy and the Kazan Khanate.
  Austria acted as a buffer state between Germany and Italy during the interwar period.
 Poland and other states between Germany and the Soviet Union have sometimes been described as buffer states, both as non-communist states before World War II and later as socialist states of the Eastern Bloc.
 Yugoslavia, which broke with the Soviet Union before the Warsaw Pact, became a buffer state between NATO and the Eastern Bloc during the Cold War.
 West Germany and  East Germany were also regarded as buffer states between NATO and the Warsaw Pact during the Cold War period in Europe.
During the Cold War,  Sweden and  Finland were sometimes regarded as buffer states between NATO and the Soviet Union. More recently, the Russo-Ukrainian War has helped push both countries into the NATO camp.
 Ukraine has been described by experts such as John Mearsheimer and Stephen Walt as a buffer state between Russia and the NATO bloc, at least up to the ousting of former President Viktor Yanukovych in February 2014.

Oceania 
  New Hebrides served as buffer between United Kingdom and France in Oceania during the New Imperialism period
  Papua New Guinea served as buffer state between Indonesia, Solomon Islands, and Vanuatu. Indonesia accused both Solomon Islands and Vanuatu for supporting the Free Papua movement during the Papua Conflict.

See also
 Indian barrier state, a British proposal to establish a Native American buffer state in the Great Lakes region of North America during the 18th and early-19th centuries
 Limitrophe states
 Puppet state
 Satellite state
 Neutral and Non-Aligned European States

References 

Former countries
Types of countries
Independence
Sovereignty
Borders
Geopolitics